Simon Kenton (aka "Simon Butler") (April 3, 1755 – April 29, 1836) was an American frontiersman and soldier in West Virginia, Kentucky, and Ohio. He was a friend of Daniel Boone, Simon Girty, Spencer Records, Thomas S. Hinde, Thomas Hinde, and Isaac Shelby. He served the United States in the Revolution, the Northwest Indian War, and the War of 1812. Surviving multiple gauntlets and ritual torture, in 1778, he was adopted into the Shawnee people. He married twice and had a total of 10 children.

Family and early life
Simon Kenton was born at the headwaters of Mill Run in the Bull Run Mountains on April 3, 1755, in Prince William County, Virginia, to Mark Kenton, Sr. (an immigrant from Ireland) and Mary Miller Kenton (whose family was Scots Welsh in ancestry). In 1771, at the age of 16, thinking he had killed William Leachman in a jealous rage (the fight began over the love of a girl named Ellen Cummins), Kenton fled into the wilderness of what is now West Virginia, Kentucky, and Ohio, where for years he went by the name "Simon Butler". After learning that his victim had lived, Kenton took back his original surname.

Noted activities

In 1774, in a conflict later labeled Dunmore's War, Kenton served as a scout for the European settlers against the Shawnee Indians in what is now West Virginia and Kentucky. In 1777, he saved the life of his friend and fellow frontiersman, Daniel Boone, at Boonesborough, Kentucky.

The following year, Kenton was rescued from the Shawnee in Ohio by Simon Girty. He had survived many days of running the gauntlet and various other ritual tortures that usually caused death. There, he was saved by Pierre Drouillard, an interpreter for the British Indian department and father of explorer George Drouillard. The Shawnee respected Kenton for his endurance; they named him Cut-ta-ho-tha (the condemned man). He was "adopted into the tribe by a motherly squaw whose own son had been slain."

Kenton served as scout on the 1778 George Rogers Clark expedition to capture Fort Sackville during the American Revolution. Independence did not mean an end to warfare; in 1793-94, Kenton fought in the Northwest Indian War with "Mad" Anthony Wayne.

Kenton started exploring the area of the Mad River Valley of Ohio and making claims as early as 1788. Kenton first saw the area a decade before while he was held as a prisoner with the Shawnee and vowed that if he survived, he would return. In April 1799, Kenton and his associate, Colonel William Ward, led a group of families from Mason County, Kentucky to an area between present-day Springfield and Urbana, Ohio.

In 1810, Kenton moved to Urbana, Ohio, where he achieved the rank of brigadier general of the state militia.  He served in the War of 1812 as both a scout and as leader of a militia group in the Battle of the Thames in 1813. This was the battle in which the Indian chief Tecumseh was killed. Kenton was chosen to identify Tecumseh's body, but recognizing both Tecumseh and another fallen warrior named Roundhead, and seeing soldiers gleefully eager to carve up Tecumseh's body into souvenirs, he identified Roundhead as the chief.

Marriage and family
Kenton married Martha Dowden and they had four children together. After she died in a house fire, the widower married Elizabeth Jarboe as his second wife. He had six children with her.

Prior to his first marriage, Simon's first son (Simon Ruth Kenton) was born to Christina Ruth in 1773.

Kenton died in (and was initially buried at) New Jerusalem in Logan County, Ohio. His body was later moved to Urbana, Ohio.

Later, his widow Elizabeth Jarboe Kenton and a number of their children moved to northwestern Indiana, to an area straddling Jasper, White, and Pulaski Counties. It was heavily settled by families who migrated from Champaign County, Ohio, where Kenton is buried.

Namesakes

Simon Kenton is the namesake of Kenton, the county seat of northwestern Ohio's Hardin County.

Kenton County, Kentucky, is named for him, as is Simon Kenton High School in Independence, the county seat.  A statue honoring him was erected in Covington, Kentucky's Riverside Drive Historic District, overlooking the Ohio River.

Simon Kenton Elementary Schools were named in Xenia and Springfield, Ohio.

Singer/songwriter Tyler Childers wrote the song "Middle Ground" in reference to Kenton and his expeditions. 

Simon Kenton Post #20 in Elsmere, Kentucky, of the Kentucky Department of the American Legion is named in his honor.

Simon Kenton Road is a residential street at the base of Bull Run Mountain in Prince William County, Virginia.

The Boy Scouts of America have the Simon Kenton Council, a division covering central Ohio to northern Kentucky.

In the Frontiersman Camping Fellowship of the Royal Rangers, Indiana, is designated the Simon Kenton Chapter.

The Simon Kenton Memorial Bridge is a suspension bridge built in 1931 that crosses the Ohio River and connects Maysville, Kentucky, and Aberdeen, Ohio.

Ohio's Simon Kenton Trail is a 32-mile multiple-use path that stretches from Springfield to Bellefontaine.

The Simon Kenton Pub is a small bar located in the Water Wheel Restaurant at The Inn at Gristmill Square in Warm Springs, Virginia. 

The Simon Kenton Inn is an 1828 historic house with five guest rooms and The Pub restaurant, located near Springfield, Ohio, on land deeded to Simon Kenton by the U.S. Government circa 1800.

References

Clark, Thomas D. Simon Kenton: Kentucky Scout; Originally published 1943; 1971 paperback reprint edition, Jesse Stuart Foundation; .
 
Crain, Ray. Simon Kenton: The Great Frontiersman. Available in either hardback or paper back; Published June 1, 1992; 
Eckert, Allan W. The Frontiersmen: A Narrative; Originally published 1967; 2001 paperback reprint edition, Jesse Stuart Foundation; . Popular history in narrative form.
Kenton, Edna. Simon Kenton: His Life and Period, 1755-1836. Originally published 1930; reprinted Salem, NH: Ayer, 1993.

External links

The Official Simon Kenton page
Simon Kenton at Ohio History Central.

References

1755 births
1836 deaths
American explorers
American folklore
American militiamen in the War of 1812
Kentucky pioneers
Indiana in the American Revolution
Kentucky militiamen in the American Revolution
American people of the Northwest Indian War
People from Urbana, Ohio